Amber Peterson (born April 24, 1982) is a Canadian freestyle skier.

Peterson was born in Thunder Bay, Ontario. She competes in aerials, and made her World Cup debut in December 1999 at  Blackcomb, British Columbia. Her first, and to date, only World Cup podium came at Lake Placid in January 2006. Peterson has made, to date, 47 World Cup starts, and appeared at 3 World Championships

Peterson competed at the 2006 Winter Olympics, but did not advance from the qualifying round, ending up 15th overall.

World Cup Podiums

References

External links
FIS profile
Official site

1982 births
Canadian female freestyle skiers
Freestyle skiers at the 2006 Winter Olympics
Living people
Olympic freestyle skiers of Canada
Sportspeople from Thunder Bay